Steffi Graf and Rennae Stubbs were the defending champions, and they successfully defended their title by defeating Larisa Neiland and Jana Novotná in the final, 6–4, 7–6(7–5).

Seeds

Draw

Draw

External links
 ITF tournament edition details

Citizen Cup - Doubles